A  dressing gown, housecoat or morning gown is a robe, a  loose-fitting outer garment, worn by either men or women. They are similar to a bathrobe but without the absorbent material.

A dressing gown or a housecoat is a loose, open-fronted gown closed with a fabric belt that is put on over nightwear on rising from bed, or, less commonly today, worn over some day clothes when partially dressed or undressed in the morning or evening (for example, over a man's shirt and trousers without jacket and tie).

Dressing gowns are typically worn around the house. They may be worn for warmth, as a convenient covering over nightwear when not being in bed, or as a form of lingerie. A dressing gown may be worn over nightwear or other clothing, or with nothing underneath. When guests or other visitors are expected to enter the household while the host(s) are partially dressed or undressed, the hosts may put on additional clothing, such as a dressing gown.

History 
The regular wearing of a dressing gown by men about the house is derived from the 18th-century wearing of the banyan in orientalist imitation. The gowns were frequently made out of fabrics such as printed cotton, silk damask, or velvet and were mainly worn by upper class men. By the mid-19th century, dressing gowns were used equally by both men and women as at-home wear. This gave men the opportunity to add color to their somber everyday wardrobe. For women, wearing a dressing gown was a break from tight corsets and layers of petticoats. Ladies wore their dressing gowns while eating breakfast, preparing for the day, sewing or having tea with their family.

Dressing gowns continued to be worn into the 20th century with similar garments like hostess dresses, robes, and peignoirs being used. However, dressing gowns began seeing less frequent usage later in the 20th century as wearing such garments became increasingly associated with idleness and lethargy. By the 21st century, dressing gowns have experienced little popularity and use. 

The Japanese yukata is an unlined, cotton kimono worn as a bathrobe or as summer outdoor clothing.

See also 
 Bathrobe

References 

History of fashion
Robes and cloaks